The 2018 Toulon Tournament (officially ) was the 46th edition of the Toulon Tournament. It was held in the department of Bouches-du-Rhône from 26 May to 9 June 2018.

England won the tournament for the third successive year beating Mexico 2–1 in the final.

Participants
Twelve participating teams were announced on 27 February 2018.

AFC
 (12th participation)
 (13th participation)
 (5th participation)
 (5th participation)

CAF
 (1st participation)
CONCACAF
 (1st participation)
 (24th participation)

UEFA
TH (20th participation)
 (41st participation)
 (29th participation)
 (9th participation)
 (5th participation)

Squads

Venues
A total of seven cities hosted the tournament.

Match officials
The referees were:

 Yusri Rudolf
Assistants: Micheal Barwegen and Daniel Belleau
 Karim Abed
Assistants: Mehdi Rahmouni and Mikaël Berchebru
 Ioannis Papadopoulos
Assistants: Ioannis Sipkas and Vasileios Kampouris
 Trustin Farrugia Cann
Assistants: Alan Camilleri and Christopher Lawrence Francalanza

 Marco Antonio Ortiz
Assistants: José Luis Camargo and Marcos Quintero
 Luís Miguel Branco Godinho
Assistants: Nuno Pereira and Luís Campos
 Radu Petrescu
Assistants: Mihai Marius Marica and Radu-Adrian-Ştefan Ghinguleac
 Choi Hyun-jai
Assistants: Joo Hyeon-min and Shin Jae-hwan

Matches rules
Every match consisted of two periods of 40 minutes each. In a match, every team had nine named substitutes and the maximum number of substitutions permitted was four.In the knockout stage, if a game tied at the end of regulation time, extra time would not be played and the penalty shoot-out would be used to determine the winner.

Group stage
The draw was held on 15 March 2018. The twelve teams were drawn into three groups of four. The group winners and the best runners-up qualified for the semi-finals. The Group stage was played from 26 May to 3 June 2018.

Group A

Group B

Group C

Classification matches
The eliminated teams played another game to determine their final ranking in the competition.

Eleventh place playoff

Ninth place playoff

Seventh place playoff

Fifth place playoff

Knockout stage

Semi-finals

Third place playoff

Final

Goalscorers
68 goals were scored in 26 matches, for an average of  goals per match.
7 goals
 Eduardo Aguirre
3 goals
 Roberto Alvarado
2 goals

 Tammy Abraham
 Dael Fry
 Eddie Nketiah
 Steve Ambri
 Jordan Tell
 Koji Miyoshi
 Ayase Ueda
 Oliver Burke
 Cho Young-wook
 Lee Kang-in
 Kévin Denkey
 Mücahit Can Akçay
 Kubilay Kanatsızkuş

1 goal

 Theo Bair
 Mathieu Choinière
 Noah Verhoeven
 Cong Zhen
 Deng Yubiao
 Yan Dinghao
 Adam Armstrong
 Callum Connolly
 Kieran Dowell
 Ronaldo Vieira
 Axel Bakayoko
 Ludovic Blas
 Wilfried Kanga
 Bryan Lasme
 Kaoru Mitoma
 Kyosuke Tagawa
 Diego Lainez
 Domingos Quina
 José Gomes
 Jota
 Luís Silva
 Pedro Martelo
 Nasser Al Ahrak
 Ahmed Jenahi
 Abdullah Murisi
 Billy Gilmour
 Fraser Hornby
 Mikey Johnston
 Jeon Se-jin
 Thomas Wogodo
 Barış Alıcı

Own goal
 Ahmed Al-Hamawende (playing against England)

Awards

Individual awards
After the final, the following players were rewarded for their performances during the competition.

Best player:  Diego Lainez
Second best player:  Lewis Cook
Third best player:  Mikey Johnston
Fourth best player:  Lee Kang-in
Breakthrough player:  Billy Gilmour
Best goalkeeper:  Freddie Woodman
Topscorer:  Eduardo Aguirre
Younger player of the final:  Diego Lainez
Best goal of the tournament:  Eddie Nketiah (playing against Scotland )
Fair-Play:

Best XI
The best XI team was a squad consisting of the eleven most impressive players at the tournament.

See also
2018 Sud Ladies Cup

References

External links
Toulon Tournament

 
2018
2017–18 in French football
2018 in youth association football
Toulon Tournament
Toulon Tournament